Trango Virtual Processors was founded in 2004 by Pierre Coulombeau and Fabrice Devaux as a subsidiary of ELSYS Design group.  Trango's purpose was to develop a real-time mobile hypervisor.  It was acquired by VMware in October 2008.

Products
Trango developed a mobile hypervisor that supported ARM architectures (ARMv5 and ARMv6) and MIPS architectures, and could run Symbian OS, WinCE, and Linux mobile operating systems, and a supporting integrated development environment (IDE).

VMware rebranded Trango's product as the VMware Mobile Virtualization Platform, which was later renamed VMware Horizon Mobile.

Notes and references

External links
White Paper MIPS Technologies  at www.mips.com
SoCs can hold key to system security at EE Times

Software companies of France
Companies established in 2004